Pedro Luis Ronchino (18 June 1928 – 1 July 2020) was an Argentine Roman Catholic bishop.

Ronchino was born in Argentina and was ordained to the priesthood in 1954. He served as bishop of the Roman Catholic Diocese of Comodoro  Rivadavia, Argentina, from 1993 until 2005.

Notes

1928 births
2020 deaths
20th-century Roman Catholic bishops in Argentina
21st-century Roman Catholic bishops in Argentina
Roman Catholic bishops of Comodoro Rivadavia